In Celtic mythology, Carman or Carmun was a warrior and sorceress from Athens who tried to invade Ireland in the days of the Tuatha Dé Danann, along with her three sons, Dub ("darkness"), Dother ("evil") and Dian ("violence"). She used her magical powers to destroy all the fruit of Ireland.

Four of the Tuatha Dé Danann, Crichinbel, Lug, Bé Chuille and Aoi, challenged Carman and her sons. The sons were forced to leave Ireland, and Carman was imprisoned. She died of longing and was buried in Wexford among oak trees. Her grave was dug by Bres. The place she was buried was called Carman after her, and the Tuatha Dé Danann are said to have instituted an Óenach Carmán, or Festival of Carmán. Celtic historian Peter Berresford Ellis describes her as "a goddess who came to Ireland from Athens with her three ferocious sons—Calma (Valiant), Dubh (Black) and Olc (Evil). They laid Ireland to waste but were eventually overcome by the Tuatha Dé Danann. Carmán died of grief and it is recorded that death ‘came upon her in an ungentle shape’. She was subsequently remembered in Leinster by a Festival of Carmán held at Lughnasad, 1 August."

Her story is told in a poem of the Metrical Dindshenchas, which states that she died in 600 BCE.

Given name
 Carman Barnes (1912-1980), American novelist
 Carman George Blough (1895-1981), American accountant
 Carman Lapointe (born 1951), Canadian diplomat
 Carman Lee (born 1966), Hong Kong actress
 Carman Maxwell (1902-1987), American animator
 Carman McClelland (born 1951), Canadian politician
 Carman Miller (born 1940), Canadian military historian
 Carman A. Newcomb (1830-1902), American politician
 Carman Newsome (1912-1974), American actor

References

External links
The Metrical Dindshenchas, edited and translated by Edward J. Gwynn, at CELT
 Volume 3, poem 1 Carmun: text and translation

Characters in Irish mythology
Women in mythology